Dewey Follett Bartlett Sr. (March 28, 1919 – March 1, 1979) was an American politician who served as the 19th governor of Oklahoma from 1967 to 1971, following his fellow Republican, Henry Bellmon.  In 1966, he became the first Roman Catholic  elected governor of Oklahoma, defeating the Democratic nominee, Preston J. Moore of Oklahoma City.  He was defeated for reelection in 1970 by Tulsa attorney David Hall in the closest election in state history.  He was elected to the United States Senate in 1972 and served one term. In 1978, he was diagnosed with lung cancer and did not run for reelection that year. He died of complications of lung cancer two months after retiring from the Senate in 1979.

Early life
Dewey Follett Bartlett was born to David A. and Jessie Bartlett in Marietta, Ohio, and attended schools in Marietta and Lawrenceville, New Jersey. Bartlett graduated from Princeton University with an undergraduate degree in geological engineering in 1942 after completing his senior thesis, titled "Water-flooding an oil formation", under the supervision of Glenn L. Jepsen and Kenneth DePencier Watson. Bartlett was the president of his senior class while a student at Princeton.

Following graduation from Princeton, Bartlett enlisted in the Navy; then served in the U.S. Marine Corps as a dive bomber during World War II in the Pacific theatre. After the war, he moved to Tulsa, Oklahoma, where he held various jobs in farming, ranching, and the oil industry, inheriting ownership of the Tulsa-based Keener Oil and Gas Company from his father, David A. Bartlett.

Political career
Prior to becoming governor, Bartlett served in the Oklahoma Senate from 1962 to 1966.

As governor, he made major changes to the Oklahoma Department of Corrections, pushed for school consolidation, and vetoed a school code bill.
In 1970, he was the first Oklahoma governor eligible to seek a second term. In the general election, he was challenged by then-Tulsa County Attorney David Hall. In the closest gubernatorial election in state history, Hall unseated Bartlett by a vote of 338,338 to 336,157.

Following his defeat for reelection as governor, he served for one term in the U.S. Senate from 1973 to 1979 after winning the seat previously held by Democrat Fred R. Harris. He narrowly defeated U.S. Congressman Ed Edmondson in the 1972 election riding on President Richard Nixon's coattails. During his tenure in Congress, he took a conservative stance on most issues and championed oil and gas interests during the energy crisis of the 1970s. However, he suffered health problems and, rather than face a very difficult reelection against popular Democratic Governor David Boren, decided not to seek reelection.  Two months after retiring from the U.S. Senate, he died in Tulsa from complications of lung cancer, and is buried in the city's Calvary Cemetery. In 1990 he was inducted into the Oklahoma CareerTech Hall of Fame and in March, 2006, Congress passed a bill renaming the U.S. Post Office in Tulsa in his honor.

Family
Bartlett married Ann Smith, a native of Seattle, Washington on April 2, 1945 at Mission San Juan Capistrano in San Juan Capistrano, California. They had three children: Dewey F. Bartlett Jr., Michael and Joanie.

His son, Dewey F. Bartlett Jr. served as mayor of Tulsa, Oklahoma, from 2009 until losing reelection to G. T. Bynum in 2016, served as a member of the Tulsa City Council from 1990 to 1994, and has inherited the Keener Oil and Gas Company from his father.

References

Further reading

External links
 100 Years of Oklahoma Governors Biography 
 
 Encyclopedia of Oklahoma History and Culture - Bartlett, Dewey 
Dewey F. Bartlett Collection and Photograph Collection at the Carl Albert Center
Voices of Oklahoma interview with Ann Bartlett. First person interview conducted on June 5, 2010, with Ann Bartlett, wife of Dewey F. Bartlett.

1919 births
1979 deaths
Politicians from Marietta, Ohio
American people of English descent
American Roman Catholics
Republican Party United States senators from Oklahoma
Republican Party governors of Oklahoma
Republican Party Oklahoma state senators
Politicians from Tulsa, Oklahoma
20th-century American politicians
Lawrenceville School alumni
Princeton University School of Engineering and Applied Science alumni
United States Marine Corps pilots of World War II
United States Marine Corps bomber pilots of World War II
United States Marine Corps officers
Deaths from lung cancer in Oklahoma
United States Navy personnel of World War II
Recipients of the Air Medal